Richa Ghosh (born 28 September 2003) is an Indian cricketer. In January 2020, at the age of 16, she was named in India's squad for the 2020 ICC Women's T20 World Cup. Later in the same month, she was also named in India's squad for the 2020 Australia women's Tri-Nation Series. On 12 February 2020, she made her WT20I debut for India, against Australia, in the final of the tri-series. In May 2021, she was awarded with a central contract for the first time.

In August 2021, Ghosh was called up to the national team, for their series against Australia. She was named in India's squad for the one-off women's Test match and Women's One Day International (WODI) matches. She made her WODI debut on 21 September 2021, for India against Australia.

She played for the Hobart Hurricanes in the 2021–22 Women's Big Bash League season. In January 2022, she was named in India's team for the 2022 Women's Cricket World Cup in New Zealand.

The wicketkeeper-batter Richa Ghosh, who is popular for her power hitting, was roped in by the Royal Challengers Bangalore (RCB) for ₹1.90 crore in year 2023.

References

External links

 

2003 births
Living people
People from Siliguri
Cricketers from West Bengal
Sportswomen from West Bengal
Indian women cricketers
India women One Day International cricketers
India women Twenty20 International cricketers
Bengal women cricketers
IPL Trailblazers cricketers
Royal Challengers Bangalore (WPL) cricketers
Hobart Hurricanes (WBBL) cricketers